Comaster is a genus of crinoids.

Species
The following species are included in the genus by the World Register of Marine Species:
 Comaster audax Rowe, Hoggett, Birtles & Vail, 1986
 Comaster multifidus (Müller, 1841)
 Comaster nobilis (Carpenter, 1884) (now synonym of Comaster schlegelii)
 Comaster schlegelii (Carpenter, 1881)

References

Comatulidae
Crinoid genera